At  above sea level, the Große Blöße is the highest hill in the Solling-Vogler Nature Park, the Solling and the Weser Uplands (Lower Saxony, Germany).

Despite its name, the summit is forested.

Geographical location 
It rises on the southeastern flank of the Helle Rift Valley (Hellentaler Graben), through which the River Helle flows. On the far, northwestern, side of this graben is the Großer Ahrensberg, the second highest hill in the Solling range.

Summit area 
The L 549 country road runs just past the unassuming summit of the Große Blöße through dense woods. The road runs from Dassel via Silberborn and Neuhaus to Boffzen.

Photographs

References 

Hills of Lower Saxony
Northeim (district)
Solling